Tom William Hartley (born 3 May 1999) is an English cricketer. He made his first-class debut on 1 August 2020, for Lancashire in the 2020 Bob Willis Trophy. He made his Twenty20 debut on 27 August 2020, for Lancashire in the 2020 t20 Blast. In April 2022, he was bought by the Manchester Originals for the 2022 season of The Hundred.

Tom is no relation to the women's cricket player Alex Hartley.

References

External links
 

1999 births
Living people
People from Ormskirk
English cricketers
Lancashire cricketers
Manchester Originals cricketers